Krasnoyarka is the name of several  rural localities in Russia.

Altai Krai
As of 2022, three rural localities in Altai Krai bear this name:
Krasnoyarka, Novichikhinsky District, Altai Krai, a settlement in Solonovsky Selsoviet of Novichikhinsky District
Krasnoyarka, Topchikhinsky District, Altai Krai, a selo in Krasnoyarsky Selsoviet of Topchikhinsky District
Krasnoyarka, Ust-Pristansky District, Altai Krai, a selo in Krasnoyarsky Selsoviet of Ust-Pristansky District

Altai Republic
As of 2022, two rural localities in the Altai Republic bear this name:
Krasnoyarka, Amurskoye Rural Settlement, Ust-Koksinsky District, Altai Republic, a settlement in Amurskoye Rural Settlement of Ust-Koksinsky District
Krasnoyarka, Ust-Koksinskoye Rural Settlement, Ust-Koksinsky District, Altai Republic, a settlement in Ust-Koksinskoye Rural Settlement of Ust-Koksinsky District

Kemerovo Oblast
As of 2022, two rural localities in Kemerovo Oblast bear this name:
Krasnoyarka, Demyanovskaya Rural Territory, Leninsk-Kuznetsky District, Kemerovo Oblast, a village in Demyanovskaya Rural Territory of Leninsk-Kuznetsky District
Krasnoyarka, Podgornovskaya Rural Territory, Leninsk-Kuznetsky District, Kemerovo Oblast, a settlement in Podgornovskaya Rural Territory of Leninsk-Kuznetsky District

Kurgan Oblast
As of 2022, two rural localities in Kurgan Oblast bear this name:
Krasnoyarka, Kirovsky Selsoviet, Mishkinsky District, Kurgan Oblast, a village in Kirovsky Selsoviet of Mishkinsky District
Krasnoyarka, Maslinsky Selsoviet, Mishkinsky District, Kurgan Oblast, a village in Maslinsky Selsoviet of Mishkinsky District

Novosibirsk Oblast
As of 2022, two rural localities in Novosibirsk Oblast bear this name:
Krasnoyarka, Tatarsky District, Novosibirsk Oblast, a selo in Tatarsky District
Krasnoyarka, Vengerovsky District, Novosibirsk Oblast, a village in Vengerovsky District

Omsk Oblast
As of 2022, four rural localities in Omsk Oblast bear this name:
Krasnoyarka, Omsky District, Omsk Oblast, a selo in Krasnoyarsky Rural Okrug of Omsky District
Krasnoyarka, Sherbakulsky District, Omsk Oblast, a selo in Krasnoyarsky Rural Okrug of Sherbakulsky District
Krasnoyarka, Kaylinsky Rural Okrug, Ust-Ishimsky District, Omsk Oblast, a village in Kaylinsky Rural Okrug of Ust-Ishimsky District
Krasnoyarka, Utuskunsky Rural Okrug, Ust-Ishimsky District, Omsk Oblast, a village in Utuskunsky Rural Okrug of Ust-Ishimsky District

Orenburg Oblast
As of 2022, two rural localities in Orenburg Oblast bear this name:
Krasnoyarka, Buguruslansky District, Orenburg Oblast, a selo in Zavyalovsky Selsoviet of Buguruslansky District
Krasnoyarka, Severny District, Orenburg Oblast, a selo in Krasnoyarsky Selsoviet of Severny District

Samara Oblast
As of 2022, one rural locality in Samara Oblast bears this name:
Krasnoyarka, Samara Oblast, a settlement in Sergiyevsky District

Sverdlovsk Oblast
As of 2022, one rural locality in Sverdlovsk Oblast bears this name:
Krasnoyarka, Sverdlovsk Oblast, a settlement under the administrative jurisdiction of the Town of Serov

Tomsk Oblast
As of 2022, one rural locality in Tomsk Oblast bears this name:
Krasnoyarka, Tomsk Oblast, a selo in Zyryansky District